Nightmares of the Decomposed is the thirteenth studio album by American death metal band Six Feet Under, released on October 2, 2020, by Metal Blade Records. It is the first album to feature ex-Cannibal Corpse guitarist Jack Owen.

Reception 

The album received mixed to negative reviews, which criticize the album's production and songwriting. Chris Barnes's vocal performance on the album was heavily criticized, with the performance being described by All About the Rock as "lacking intensity and punch, to say they are lethargic and fatigued would be generous".

Track listing

Personnel 
Credits are adapted from the album's liner notes.

Six Feet Under
Chris Barnes – vocals, producer
Jeff Hughell – bass
 Ray Suhy – guitars
Jack Owen – guitars, songwriting
Marco Pitruzzella – drums

Miscellaneous staff
Chris Carrol – mixing, producing, mastering
Chaz Najjar – mastering
Luke Hunter – artwork

Charts

References 

2020 albums
Six Feet Under (band) albums
Metal Blade Records albums